Cristian Eduardo Carrasco González (born on 7 July 1978 in Santiago de Chile) is a Chilean former professional footballer who played as a forward.

Career
As a child, Carrasco joined Audax Italiano youth system at the age of 7, coinciding with well-known players such as Rafael Olarra and Alejandro Carrasco. Then he moved to Unión Española, aged 17. After playing for clubs in his country at the three mainly divisions, he went to Indonesia.

He played for Persim Maros, where also played his compatriot Fernando Cárdenas, Persita Tangerang in the Indonesian Super League, among other clubs. With Persim Maros, he scored forty goals between 2002 and 2003.

He has continued on playing football for exhibition games alongside players such as Claudio Martínez and Alejandro Tobar.

Personal life
He is known as "Spider-Man" for his penchant of putting on a Spider-Man mask to celebrate after scoring a goal. Carrasco puts it down to his love for the comic character while growing up.

References

External links
 
 
 Cristian Carrasco at playmakerstats.com (English version of ceroacero.es)
 

Living people
1978 births
Footballers from Santiago
Chilean footballers
Association football forwards
Chilean Primera División players
Primera B de Chile players
Tercera División de Chile players
Unión Española footballers
Indonesian Premier Division players
Liga 2 (Indonesia) players
Liga 1 (Indonesia) players
Persim Maros players
PSMS Medan players
Persebaya Surabaya players
Persipura Jayapura players
Persma Manado players
PSM Makassar players
Persita Tangerang players
San Marcos de Arica footballers
Chilean expatriate footballers
Chilean expatriate sportspeople in Indonesia
Chilean expatriate sportspeople in East Timor
Expatriate footballers in Indonesia
Expatriate footballers in East Timor
Chilean football managers
Chilean expatriate football managers
Expatriate football managers in Indonesia